Soviet Information Bureau (commonly known as Sovinformburo []) was a leading Soviet news agency, operating from 1941 to 1961.

Operation

The  Axis  invasion of the Soviet Union started on 22 June 1941, opening the Eastern Front of World War II. On 24 June 1941 a directive of Sovnarkom and the Central Committee of the Communist Party of the Soviet Union established the Sovinformburo "to bring into the limelight international events, military developments, and day-to-day life through printed and broadcast media". 

During World War II the Sovinformburo directed the activity of the All-Slavonic Committee, the Anti-Fascist Committee of Soviet Women, the Anti-Fascist Committee of the Soviet Youth, the Anti-Fascist Committee of Soviet Scientists and the Jewish Anti-Fascist Committee (JAC). In 1944 a special bureau on propaganda for foreign countries was set up as part of Sovinformburo. In 1961 the Sovinformburo was transformed into Novosti Press Agency which was succeeded by RIA Novosti in 1991 and, in 2013, by International Information Agency Russia Today.

Yuri Levitan made the radio announcements on Radio Moscow (known for its "Wide is My Motherland" call-sign). While Radio Moscow always started its announcements with the words "Moscow is speaking", during the Axis aggression against the Soviet Union in World War II broadcasts came from Sverdlovsk (today Yekaterinburg) until 1943, when activity moved to Kuibyshev (present-day  Samara) until 1945.

The Soviet Information Bureau never announced the fall of Kiev in 1941.

Chairmen 
Aleksandr Sergeevich Scherbakov (1941–1945)

Solomon Abramovich Lozovsky (1946–1947) 

Boris Nikolaevich Ponomarev (1947–1961)

Radio announcers
 Yuri Levitan

See also
Eastern Bloc information dissemination
Censorship in the Soviet Union
Propaganda in the Soviet Union

References

Mass media in the Soviet Union
Soviet propaganda organizations

1941 establishments in the Soviet Union
Mass media companies established in 1941
1961 disestablishments in the Soviet Union
Eastern Bloc mass media
News agencies based in Russia